Oquitoa is a small town surrounded by Oquitoa Municipality in the northwest of the  Mexican state of Sonora.

History
It was founded in 1689 by the Jesuit missionary: Eusebio Kino.  One theory is that the name Oquitoa means "white woman" in the Piman language. Another, taken from the 1910 publication "New Trails in Mexico" by Karl Lumholtz is that the name Oquitoa is taken from the O'odham or Piman Phrase, Hukit'o, "next to" or "nearby"(Lumholtz, p. 391, 1990) in reference to the nearby San Ignacio river. Louis Alphonse Pinart's Vocabulario de la Lengua Papaga, 1897, collected in Pitiquito Sonora Mexico from Trinidad Peralta and the Papago governor, Mattias Parra of the Papago community of Pitiquito corroborates Lumholtz's definition of Oquitoa as "hukit'o" Oks Toha, or Oquitoa as defined by the first theory as white woman, literally means 'woman white' that even in the structure of Piman grammar is awkward and is therefore highly unlikely.

Health and education
There were only two primary schools and one doctor in a small health clinic in 2000.

Economic activity
Agriculture covered 901 hectares (2000), most of which were not irrigated.  Main crops are  alfalfa, beans, corn and the production of fodder for the cattle industry.  

Cattle raising was carried out by most of the work force (2000).

Tourist sights
Of touristic importance is the San Antonio Paduano del Oquitoa mission, the only still-used church in the region of Jesuit (pre-1767) construction. Oquitoa is considered by many to be the gem of the Kino missions.  Padre Kino first makes mention of San Antonio de Uquetoa on January 19, 1689, when the Father Visitor Manuel Gonzales assigned Father Antonio Arias as its first priest. The church apparently had a facelift by the Franciscans between 1788 and 1797, and was restored in 1920 

This simple adobe hall church stands atop a small hill in the midst of the village cemetery.

References

 Enciclopedia de los Municipios de Mexico
 INEGI

External links
 Oquitoa mission history
 Kino Missions

Populated places in Sonora
Populated places established in 1689
Populated places in the Sonoran Desert of Mexico
1689 establishments in New Spain